Revolutionary spontaneity, also known as spontaneism, is a revolutionary socialist tendency that believes the social revolution can and should occur spontaneously from below by the working class itself, without the aid or guidance of a vanguard party and that it cannot and should not be brought about by the actions of individuals such as professional revolutionaries or political parties who might attempt to foment such a revolution.

In his work What Is to Be Done? (1902), Vladimir Lenin argued fiercely against revolutionary spontaneity as a dangerous revisionist concept that strips away the disciplined nature of Marxist political thought and leaves it arbitrary and ineffective. Rosa Luxemburg, who defended spontaneity on Organizational Questions of the Russian Social Democracy, and the Spartacist League which had attempted to overturn capitalism during the 1919 German Revolution would become main targets of Lenin's attacks after World War I.

Mao-Spontex 
The term Mao-Spontex refers to a political movement in the Marxist and libertarian movements in Western Europe from 1960 to 1970. Mao-Spontex came to represent an ideology promoting the ideas of Maoism, along with some ideas from Marxism and Leninism, but rejecting the total idea of Marxism–Leninism. Lenin's work What Is to Be Done? especially is criticized as dated and Lenin's critique of spontaneity is rejected. Lenin's idea of democratic centralism is supported as a way to organize a party, but a party must also have constant conflict inside of it to remain revolutionary. The revolutionary party discussed must also always be from a mass worker's movement.

See also 
 Anarchism
 Crowd psychology
 Impossibilism
 Invisible dictatorship
 Left communism in China
 Luxemburgism
 Spontaneous order
 Immediatism
 Spontis

References 

Anarchist theory
Communism
Revolution terminology